The 1985 Special Honours in New Zealand was a Special Honours Lists, dated 6 November 1985, to recognise the incoming governor-general, Sir Paul Reeves, and the outgoing governor-general and viceregal consort, Sir David and Lady Beattie.

Order of Saint Michael and Saint George

Knight Grand Cross (GCMG)
 The Most Reverend Sir Paul Alfred Reeves – Governor-General Designate

Companion of the Queen's Service Order (QSO)
Additional, for community service
 Norma Margaret Sarah, Lady Beattie

Additional, for public services
 The Honourable Sir David Stuart Beattie  – Principal Companion of the Queen's Service Order and Governor-General and Commander-in-Chief in and over New Zealand since 1980

References

Special honours
Special honours